Engaeus sternalis, the Warragul burrowing crayfish, is a species of crayfish in the family Parastacidae. It is endemic to Australia. It is only known from locations on the Labertuche Creek and Wattle Creek (a tributary of Labertouche Creek) in west Gippsland. It is a cryptic, burrowing species with a very limited distribution, and virtually nothing is known about its ecology, population dynamics or habitat requirements.

References

Sources
Doran, N. & Horwitz, P. 2010. Engaeus sternalis. IUCN Red List of Threatened Species 2010. Retrieved 5 February 2017.

Parastacidae
Freshwater crustaceans of Australia
Critically endangered fauna of Australia
Crustaceans described in 1936
Taxonomy articles created by Polbot